Robert Howard, 2nd Earl of Wicklow (7 August 1757 – 23 October 1815) was an Anglo-Irish politician and peer.

Howard was the eldest son of Ralph Howard, 1st Viscount Wicklow and his wife, Alice Howard, 1st Countess of Wicklow. Howard's mother had been made a peeress in her own right following the death of her husband.

He served in the Irish House of Commons as the Member of Parliament for St Johnstown between 1776 and 1789. On 26 June 1789, he succeeded to his father's title, forcing him to resign his seat in the Commons, and he assumed his seat in the Irish House of Lords. Following the implementation of the Acts of Union 1800 he was elected as one of the original 28 Irish representative peers and took his seat in the British House of Lords. Following his mother's death on 7 March 1807, he succeeded to his mother's title as Earl of Wicklow.

He never married, and was succeeded in his titles by his younger brother, William Howard.

References

1757 births
1815 deaths
18th-century Anglo-Irish people
19th-century Anglo-Irish people
Robert
Irish MPs 1776–1783
Irish MPs 1783–1790
Irish representative peers
Members of the Irish House of Lords
Members of the Parliament of Ireland (pre-1801) for County Donegal constituencies
2